Epiphyas balioptera is a species of moth of the family Tortricidae. It is found in Australia, where it has been recorded from Queensland.

The forewings are whitish, strigulated (finely streaked) with pale ochreous brown. The hindwings are grey whitish, strigulated with grey.

References

Moths described in 1916
Epiphyas